Orland John Kurtenbach (born September 7, 1936) is a Canadian former professional ice hockey player and coach. A centre notable for his defensive skill and as one of the toughest fighters in the game, he played for several National Hockey League (NHL) teams during his twenty professional seasons, principally the Vancouver Canucks, with whom he became the NHL franchise's inaugural captain.

Early life
Kurtenbach was born in Cudworth, Saskatchewan.  He grew up on a farm until his family moved to Prince Albert, Saskatchewan, at age 10. It was at this time that Kurtenbach began playing organized hockey. Beginning as a defenceman, he moved to the centre position later in his career.

Playing career
Kurtenbach played in the Saskatchewan Junior Hockey League (SJHL) with the Prince Albert Mintos for two seasons, also making brief appearances with the Saskatoon Quakers of the minor professional Western Hockey League (WHL) during that time. In 1957, after Prince Albert was eliminated from the SJHL playoffs, Kurtenbach finished the season with the Flin Flon Bombers, where he helped the team win a Memorial Cup.

Kurtenbach turned professional in 1957–58, signing a C-form with the Vancouver Canucks of the WHL. He scored 54 points in 52 games en route to earning Rookie of the Year honours. In the playoffs, he helped the Canucks to a President's Cup championship.

The majority of Kurtenbach's early professional career was spent in the minors, splitting time between the AHL with the Buffalo Bisons, Springfield Indians and Providence Reds, and the WHL with the San Francisco Seals and the Canucks.  His best season in this stretch was 1962–63, when he notched 87 points for the Seals in 70 games and led the team in scoring in the playoffs en route to winning the league championship.

During his time in the minors, Kurtenbach made two brief appearances in the National Hockey League with the New York Rangers and Boston Bruins, totaling eighteen games, but he did not play his first full NHL season until 1963–64 with the Bruins. In 1965–66, he became a member of the Toronto Maple Leafs, where he played a primarily defensive role. Toronto coach Punch Imlach designated Kurtenbach to the bottom two offensive lines, while earning mostly penalty killing time. The following season, he joined the New York Rangers, where he spent four seasons. In the 1970 off-season, he was told by Rangers management he would be unprotected for the upcoming NHL Expansion Draft to be picked up by either the Buffalo Sabres or the Vancouver Canucks (the franchise left the WHL to join the NHL).

Kurtenbach was obtained by the Canucks and was named the franchise's first NHL captain. On December 12, 1970, he recorded the first hat trick in Canucks history in a 5-2 victory over the California Golden Seals, it was also the only hat trick he ever recorded in his career. He recorded at an NHL career high point-per-game pace with 53 points in 52 games, despite suffering a serious injury on December 23 that sidelined him until March 3. The following season, he registered a career-high 61 points in 78 games. Many of Vancouver's players left the club that season, defecting to the nascent World Hockey Association (WHA) for larger salaries. Kurtenbach himself was offered a $150,000 contract with the Los Angeles Sharks, but he declined. He often played on a line with Wayne Maki and Murray Hall. Kurtenbach retired from the NHL after his fourth season with Vancouver.

Kurtenbach finished his NHL career with 119 goals and 213 assists for 332 points in 639 games, adding 628 penalty minutes. On October 26, 2010, Kurtenbach was the first Canucks player inducted into the team's Ring of Honour. A ceremony was held prior to a Canucks' game against the Colorado Avalanche.

Coaching career
The season after his NHL retirement, Kurtenbach joined the Seattle Totems of the Central Hockey League, moving behind the bench as head coach. After a losing season with Seattle, he coached two seasons with the Tulsa Oilers of the same league and won a championship in his first season with them, 1975–76, being awarded the Jake Milford Trophy as CHL coach of the year.

In 1976–77, Kurtenbach returned to the NHL to replace Phil Maloney midway through the season as head coach of the Vancouver Canucks. This marked the third time in his playing and coaching career that he would represent Vancouver. However, after one and a half seasons and a 36–62–27 record, Kurtenbach was replaced by Harry Neale at the end of the 1977–78 season. Upon his replacement, Kurtenbach only returned to coaching to represent the Springfield Indians of the AHL in 1982 and the Richmond Sockeyes of the BCHL in 1986 (whom he guided to the 1987 Centennial Cup)
before retiring.

Personal life
During his time with the Vancouver Canucks of the WHL, he met his wife. In the 1970s he lived in north Burnaby with his wife Laurel and kids. In 1980s and 1990s he lived in White Rock, BC and operated a south Surrey, BC golf driving range.

Career statistics

Regular season and playoffs

Awards and achievements

Player
 WHL Rookie of the Year - 1958
 Cyclone Taylor Trophy (Vancouver Canucks' MVP) - 1971, 1972, 1973
 Cyrus H. McLean Trophy (Vancouver Canucks' leading scorer) - 1972 (tied with André Boudrias)

Coach
Jake Milford Trophy (CHL coach of the year) - 1976

Coaching record

References

External links
 
 

1936 births
Living people
Boston Bruins players
Buffalo Bisons (AHL) players
Canadian ice hockey centres
Canadian ice hockey coaches
Canadian people of German descent
Ice hockey people from Saskatchewan
New York Rangers players
Omaha Knights (CHL) players
Providence Reds players
San Francisco Seals (ice hockey) players
Saskatoon Quakers players
Sportspeople from Prince Albert, Saskatchewan
Springfield Indians players
Toronto Maple Leafs players
Vancouver Canucks (WHL) players
Vancouver Canucks captains
Vancouver Canucks coaches
Vancouver Canucks players